NGC 1817 is an open cluster of stars in the constellation Taurus. It was discovered by English astronomer William Herschel in February 1784. With an apparent magnitude of 7.7 and spanning 9.3 arc minutes across the sky, it is separated from the NGC 1807 cluster by just 26 arc minutes. Indeed, the two may actually be parts of a single extended cluster.

The NGC 1817 cluster is around the same age as the Hyades, or perhaps a little younger at 0.8−1.2 billion years. The turnoff point for this cluster—where stars above a certain mass are evolving through the red giant stage—is twice the mass of the Sun.

Measurements of the proper motion of 810 stars within a 1.5° region centered on the cluster suggest that it has at least 169 members. Of these, there is a total of 26 variable stars, including three candidate Gamma Doradus variable stars and sixteen Delta Scuti variables. This unusually high proportion of Delta Scuti variables is likely the result of the turnoff point being located within the instability strip.

Gallery

References

External links
 

1817
Taurus (constellation)
Open clusters